Horosuu is a ghost town in Rõuge Parish, Võru County in Estonia.

References

Villages in Võru County
Ghost towns in Estonia